Caulimovirus is a genus of viruses, in the family Caulimoviridae order Ortervirales. Plants serve as natural hosts. There are 12 species in this genus. Diseases associated with this genus include: vein-clearing or banding mosaic.

Taxonomy
The genus contains the following species:
Angelica bushy stunt virus
Atractylodes mild mottle virus
Carnation etched ring virus
Cauliflower mosaic virus
Dahlia mosaic virus
Figwort mosaic virus
Horseradish latent virus
Lamium leaf distortion virus
Mirabilis mosaic virus
Soybean Putnam virus
Strawberry vein banding virus
Thistle mottle virus

Structure
Viruses in Caulimovirus are non-enveloped, with icosahedral geometries, and T=7, T=7 symmetry. The diameter is around 50 nm. Genomes are circular and non-segmented. The genome codes for 6 to 7 proteins.

Life cycle
Viral replication is nuclear/cytoplasmic. Entry into the host cell is achieved by attachment of the viral proteins to host receptors, which mediates endocytosis. Replication follows the dsDNA-RT replication model. DNA-templated transcription, specifically dsDNA-RT transcription is the method of transcription. Translation takes place by ribosomal shunting. The virus exits the host cell by nuclear pore export, and  tubule-guided viral movement. Plants serve as the natural host. The virus is transmitted via a vector (aphid insects). Transmission routes are mechanical.

References

External links
 Viralzone: Caulimovirus
 ICTV

Caulimoviridae
Virus genera